The Romania men's national water polo team is the representative for Romania in international men's water polo.

Results

Olympic Games

 1952 – 17th place
 1956 – 8th place
 1960 – 5th place
 1964 – 5th place
 1972 – 8th place
 1976 – 4th place
 1980 – 9th place
 1996 – 11th place
 2012 – 10th place

World Championship

 1973 – 7th place
 1975 – 5th place
 1978 – 6th place
 1991 – 9th place
 1994 – 13th place
 2003 – 12th place
 2005 – 6th place
 2007 – 11th place
 2009 – 7th place
 2011 – 12th place
 2013 – 13th place

World Cup

 1979 – 7th place
 1991 – 6th place
 2006 – 6th place
 2010 – 5th place

World League

 2005 – 12th place
 2006 – 11th place
 2007 – 6th place
 2008 – 17th place
 2009 – 16th place
 2010 – 14th place
 2011 – 9th place
 2012 – 10th place
 2013 – Preliminary round
 2014 – Preliminary round
 2015 – Preliminary round
 2016 – Preliminary round
 2017 – Preliminary round
 2018 – Preliminary round

European Championship

 1954 – 10th place
 1962 – 5th place
 1966 – 6th place
 1970 – 6th place
 1974 – 6th place
 1977 – 7th place
 1981 – 7th place
 1983 – 8th place
 1987 – 7th place
 1989 – 5th place
 1991 – 8th place
 1993 – 4th place
 1995 – 11th place
 1999 – 9th place
 2001 – 11th place
 2003 – 10th place
 2006 – 4th place
 2008 – 9th place
 2010 – 7th place
 2012 – 8th place
 2014 – 8th place
 2016 – 10th place
 2018 – 11th place
 2020 – 11th place
 2022 – 10th place

Team

Current squad
Roster for the 2020 Men's European Water Polo Championship.

Head coach: Athanasios Kechagias

Notable players
 Vlad Hagiu
 Nicolae Firoiu
 Andrei Iosep
 Cosmin Radu
 Bogdan Rath (later Italy)

See also
 Romania men's Olympic water polo team records and statistics

References

External links

Men's national water polo teams
 
Men's sport in Romania